The National Black Law Students Association (NBLSA), founded in 1968, is a nationwide organization formed to articulate and promote the needs and goals of black law students and effectuates change in the legal community.  As the largest law student organization in the country with over 6,000 members, NBLSA includes chapters or affiliates in six countries including the Bahamas, Nigeria, and South Africa.  NBLSA encourages the development of talented, social conscious lawyers of tomorrow.  NBLSA help start the Black Law Students Association of Canada (BLSAC), the National Latino/Latina Student Association (NLLSA), National Association of Law Students with Disabilities (NALSD), and the National Asian Pacific American Law Student Association (NAPALSA).  The headquarters of NBLSA is located in Washington, D.C.  Organized into six regions (Northeast, Mid-Atlantic, Southern, Mid-West, Rocky Mountain and Western Region) the organization has over 200 chapters and is present in all but a few of the nation's accredited law schools, as well as unaccredited law schools.  Each year, the organization holds an annual convention to engage in legal activism and while preparing new generations of black lawyers to "effectuate change."  Additionally, the Frederick Douglass Moot Court and Thurgood Marshall Mock Trial Competitions are held during its Annual Convention.

In 1968, Algernon Johnson Cooper, former mayor of Prichard, Alabama, founded the first Black American Law Students Association at the New York University Law School.  In 1983, BALSA revised its name and the word "American" was deleted to encompass all blacks, including those not of American nationality.  Later, the word "National" was added to reflect the organization's national expansion, which now includes representation in the law schools of forty-eight states and Puerto Rico.

The association has ties with the National Bar Association, the Council on Legal Education Opportunity, The National Black Alliance, and the National Black Leadership Roundtable.

At the fortieth anniversary convention of the NBLSA in Detroit Cooper, speaking on the origins of the organization, said:

References

External links 
 
 Founding chapter of BLSA at NYU Law School

Student governments in the United States
African-American professional organizations
Legal education in the United States
Organizations based in Washington, D.C.
Student organizations established in 1968
1968 establishments in New York City